The 2020 Kategoria e Tretë was the 17th official season of the Albanian football fourth division since its establishment. The season began on 20 February 2020 and ended on 17 July 2020. There were 8 teams competing this season. The competition was suspended from 12 March to 4 June 2020, due to a pandemic of COVID-19 in Albania. Bulqiza and Labëria gained promotion to the 2020–21 Kategoria e Dytë. Labëria won their first Kategoria e Tretë title.

Changes from last season

Team changes

From Third Division
Promoted to Kategoria e Dytë:
 Mirdita
 Selenica

Stadia by capacity and locations

League standings

References

4
Albania
Kategoria e Tretë seasons